Khanlar Mirza (Persian: خانلر میرزا) whose royal title was Ehtesham-ed-Dowleh (احتشام الدوله) was one of the most prominent princes of the Qajar dynasty. He was the seventeenth son of Crown Prince Abbas Mirza and commander of Nasser al-Din Shah's forces in Bushehr during the Anglo-Persian War.

Biography 

On 25 October 1856 Persian forces re-occupied the city of Herat. Britain declared war on Iran on 1 November 1856 Anglo-Persian War. Iran managed to release the city from the Afghan insurgents. In response on 10 November a British-Indian Naval squadron, commanded by Commodore Young, were sent from the coast of the Indian Ocean to the Persian Gulf via Strait of Hormuz, which heavily bombarded the Iranian cities of Bushehr, Ahwaz and Mohammerah (the present Khorramshahr). A British Army expeditionary force, under Major General Sir James Outram, 1st Baronet, which included General Stalker commanding a division of the 78th Highlanders or Ross-Shire Buffs advanced from Bushehr to Boorzgoon and defeated the forces of Khanlar Mirza and occupy Bushehr and Lengeh port cities as well as Boorzgoon and Khorramshahr, Khark Islalnd and Ahwaz. 

The capture of Boorzgoon resulted in destruction of the Iranian stores. Khanlar Mirza’s force was attacked at Kooshab on 7 February 1857 and heavily defeated. After his return to Bushehr, Outram left Major-General Stalker to hold the town. Outram's forces crossed the Persian Gulf to the delta of the Euphrates, up which he advanced to Mohammerah, some sixty miles inland. On 26 March the Navy bombarded the strong Persian positions and forts in Mohammerah. When the 500 British troops were landed under Brigadier-General Sir Henry Havelock, they entered with little resistance and captured a further large supply of stores. Havelock gave full credit for the ease with which he accomplished his mission to the Navy, who in turn owed its immunity from heavy casualties to the foresight of Commander Rennie. Prince Khanlar Mirza, retreated to Shuster.

The Paris Agreement was signed between the two countries with the mediation of France and resulted in the withdrawal of the British forces from the port city. The Anglo-Persian War ended on 4 March 1857.

Khanlar Mirza died in 1862. At that time he was governor of Isfahan.

Sons
Jalaleddine Mirza royal title: Ehtesham-ol-Molk
Nasrollah Mirza
Ali-Mohammad Mirza royal title: Ehtesham-ol-Mamalek
Gohlam-Husain Mirza royal title: Shabeh-Soltan
Akbar Mirza

References

Further reading
War between Iran and England in Khorram Shahr (Mohammareh). Persian title: " Jang-i Iran va Ingilistan dar Khurramshahr (Muhammarih)" 
 The Persian Encyclopedia, articles on Abbas Mirza, Persia-Russia Wars
"Tarikeh Azodi" (History of the Azodi) by Dr. Aboul Husain Navahi. Haydary Publishers 1976 Tehran.

Qajar princes
Year of birth missing
Year of death missing
19th-century Iranian military personnel
People of the Anglo-Persian War
Governors of Isfahan